The Paralympic Committee of Kosovo, (/ Paraolimpijski komitet Kosova), is the governing body for parasports in Kosovo.

History
The Paralympic Committee of Kosovo was granted provisional membership of the International Paralympic Committee by its Governing Board on 16 July 2022. Full membership is expected to be granted at the next IPC General Assembly. Provisional membership grants all the privileges of full membership except the ability to vote, propose motions or nominate candidates at meetings of the General Assembly. Provisional membership gives athletes from Kosovo the right to participate in the Paralympic Games and Kosovo is expected to make its Paralympic debut at Paris 2024.

See also
Kosovo at the Paralympics
Olympic Committee of Kosovo
Membership of Kosovo in international sports federations

References

External links
Paralympic Committee of Kosovo
Paralympic Committee of Kosovo profile at the International Paralympic Committee

National Paralympic Committees
Parasports organizations
Paralympic